Yeganeh is a Persian origin word which is used as a surname. People with the name include:

Surname
 Artimes Farshad Yeganeh (born 1981), Iranian rock climber 
 Hamid Naderi Yeganeh (born 1990), Iranian digital artist
 Mohsen Yeganeh (born 1985), Iranian musician
 Nasser Yeganeh (1921–1993), Iranian jurist and politician 
 Mohammed Yeganeh (1923–1995), Iranian economist 

Persian-language surnames
Toponymic surnames